

Events

Pre-1600
 474 – Emperor Leo II dies after a reign of ten months. He is succeeded by his father Zeno, who becomes sole ruler of the Byzantine Empire.
 937 – Ten Kingdoms: Li Bian usurps the throne and deposes Emperor Yang Pu. The Wu State is replaced by Li (now called "Xu Zhigao"), who becomes the first ruler of Southern Tang.
1202 – Fourth Crusade: Despite letters from Pope Innocent III forbidding it and threatening excommunication, Catholic crusaders begin a siege of Zara (now Zadar, Croatia).
1293 – Raden Wijaya is crowned as the first monarch of Majapahit kingdom of Java, taking the throne name Kertarajasa Jayawardhana.
1444 – Battle of Varna: The crusading forces of King Władysław III of Poland (aka Ulaszlo I of Hungary and Władysław III of Varna) are defeated by the Turks under Sultan Murad II and Władysław is killed.
1599 – Åbo Bloodbath: Fourteen gentries who opposed Duke Charles were decapitated in the Old Great Square of Turku for their involvement in the power struggle between King Sigismund and Duke Charles and the related peasant revolt known as the Cudgel War.

1601–1900
1659 – Chattrapati Shivaji Maharaj, Maratha King kills Afzal Khan, Adilshahi in the battle popularly known as Battle of Pratapgarh. 
1674 – Third Anglo-Dutch War: As provided in the Treaty of Westminster, Netherlands cedes New Netherland to England.
1702 – English colonists under the command of James Moore besiege Spanish St. Augustine during Queen Anne's War.
1766 – The last colonial governor of New Jersey, William Franklin, signs the charter of Queen's College (later renamed Rutgers University).
1775 – The United States Marine Corps is founded at Tun Tavern in Philadelphia by Samuel Nicholas.
1793 – A Goddess of Reason is proclaimed by the French Convention at the suggestion of Pierre Gaspard Chaumette.
1821 – Cry of Independence by Rufina Alfaro at La Villa de Los Santos, Panama setting into motion a revolt which led to Panama's independence from Spain and to it immediately becoming part of Colombia.
1847 – The passenger ship Stephen Whitney is wrecked in thick fog off the southern coast of Ireland, killing 92 of the 110 on board. The disaster results in the construction of the Fastnet Rock lighthouse.
1865 – Major Henry Wirz, the superintendent of a prison camp in Andersonville, Georgia, is hanged, becoming one of only three American Civil War soldiers executed for war crimes.
1871 – Henry Morton Stanley locates missing explorer and missionary, Dr David Livingstone in Ujiji, near Lake Tanganyika, famously greeting him with the words, "Dr. Livingstone, I presume?".
1898 – Beginning of the Wilmington insurrection of 1898, the only instance of a municipal government being overthrown in United States history.

1901–present
1910 – The date of Thomas A. Davis' opening of the San Diego Army and Navy Academy, although the official founding date is November 23, 1910.
1918 – The Western Union Cable Office in North Sydney, Nova Scotia, receives a top-secret coded message from Europe (that would be sent to Ottawa and Washington, D.C.) that said on November 11, 1918, all fighting would cease on land, sea and in the air.
1939 – Finnish author F. E. Sillanpää is awarded the Nobel Prize in Literature.
1940 – The 1940 Vrancea earthquake strikes Romania killing an estimated 1,000 and injuring approximately 4,000 more.
1942 – World War II: Germany invades Vichy France following French Admiral François Darlan's agreement to an armistice with the Allies in North Africa.
1944 – The ammunition ship  explodes at Seeadler Harbour, Manus, Admiralty Islands, killing at least 432 and wounding 371.
1945 – Heavy fighting in Surabaya between Indonesian nationalists and returning colonialists after World War II, today celebrated as Heroes' Day (Hari Pahlawan).
1946 – A magnitude 6.9 earthquake in the Peruvian Andes mountains kills at least 1,400 people.
1951 – With the rollout of the North American Numbering Plan, direct-dial coast-to-coast telephone service begins in the United States.
1954 – U.S. President Dwight D. Eisenhower dedicates the USMC War Memorial (Iwo Jima memorial) in Arlington Ridge Park in Arlington County, Virginia.
1958 – The Hope Diamond is donated to the Smithsonian Institution by New York diamond merchant Harry Winston.
1969 – National Educational Television (the predecessor to the Public Broadcasting Service) in the United States debuts Sesame Street.
1970 – Vietnam War: Vietnamization: For the first time in five years, an entire week ends with no reports of American combat fatalities in Southeast Asia.
  1970   – Luna 17: unmanned space mission launched by the Soviet Union.
1971 – In Cambodia, Khmer Rouge forces attack the city of Phnom Penh and its airport, killing 44, wounding at least 30 and damaging nine aircraft.
  1971   – A Merpati Nusantara Airlines Vickers Viscount crashes into the Indian Ocean near Padang, West Sumatra, Indonesia, killing all 69 people on board.
1972 – Southern Airways Flight 49 from Birmingham, Alabama is hijacked and, at one point, is threatened with crashing into the nuclear installation at the Oak Ridge National Laboratory. After two days, the plane lands in Havana, Cuba, where the hijackers are jailed by Fidel Castro.
1975 – The 729-foot-long freighter  sinks during a storm on Lake Superior, killing all 29 crew on board.
  1975   – Israeli-Palestinian conflict: the United Nations General Assembly passes Resolution 3379, determining that Zionism is a form of racism.
1979 – A 106-car Canadian Pacific freight train carrying explosive and poisonous chemicals from Windsor, Ontario, Canada derails in Mississauga, Ontario, just west of Toronto, causing a massive explosion and the largest peacetime evacuation in Canadian history and one of the largest in North American history.
1983 – Bill Gates introduces Windows 1.0.
1989 – Longtime Bulgarian leader Todor Zhivkov is removed from office and replaced by Petar Mladenov. 
  1989   – Germans begin to tear down the Berlin Wall.
1995 – In Nigeria, playwright and environmental activist Ken Saro-Wiwa, along with eight others from the Movement for the Survival of the Ogoni People (Mosop), are hanged by government forces.
1997 – WorldCom and MCI Communications announce a $37 billion merger (the largest merger in US history at the time).
2002 – Veteran's Day Weekend Tornado Outbreak: A tornado outbreak stretching from Northern Ohio to the Gulf Coast, one of the largest outbreaks recorded in November. The strongest tornado, an F4, hits Van Wert, Ohio, during the early to mid afternoon and destroys a movie theater, which had been evacuated.
2006 – Sri Lankan Tamil politician Nadarajah Raviraj is assassinated in Colombo.
  2006   – The National Museum of the Marine Corps in Quantico, Virginia is opened and dedicated by U.S. President George W. Bush, who announces that Marine Corporal Jason Dunham will posthumously receive the Medal of Honor.
2008 – Over five months after landing on Mars, NASA declares the Phoenix mission concluded after communications with the lander were lost.
2009 – Ships of the South and North Korean navies skirmish off Daecheong Island in the Yellow Sea.
2019 – President of Bolivia Evo Morales and several of his government resign after 19 days of civil protests and a recommendation from the military.
2020 – Armenia and Azerbaijan sign a ceasefire agreement, ending the 2020 Nagorno-Karabakh war, and prompting protests in Armenia.

Births

Pre-1600
 745 – Musa al-Kadhim the seventh Shia Imam (d.  799)
1278 – Philip I, Prince of Taranto (d. 1332)
1341 – Henry Percy, 1st Earl of Northumberland, English politician (d. 1408)
1433 – Charles the Bold, Duke of Burgundy (d. 1477)
1480 – Bridget of York, English nun (d. 1517)
1483 – Martin Luther, German monk and priest, leader of the Protestant Reformation (d. 1546)
1489 – Henry V, Duke of Brunswick-Lüneburg and Prince of Wolfenbüttel (d. 1568)
1490 – John III, Duke of Cleves (d. 1539)
1520 – Dorothea of Denmark, Electress Palatine, Princess of Denmark, Sweden and Norway (d. 1580)
1547 – Gebhard Truchsess von Waldburg, Archbishop of Cologne (d. 1601)
1565 – Robert Devereux, 2nd Earl of Essex, English general and politician, Lord Lieutenant of Ireland (d. 1601)
  1565   – Laurentius Paulinus Gothus, Swedish astronomer and theologian (d. 1646)
1577 – Jacob Cats, Dutch poet, jurist, and politician (d. 1660)
1584 – Catherine of Sweden, Countess Palatine of Kleeburg (d. 1638)

1601–1900
1620 – Ninon de l'Enclos, French courtier and author (d. 1705)
1668 – François Couperin, French organist and composer (d. 1733)
  1668   – Louis, Prince of Condé (d. 1710)
1695 – John Bevis, English physician and astronomer (d. 1771)
1697 – William Hogarth, English painter, illustrator, and critic (d. 1764)
1710 – Adam Gottlob Moltke, Danish courtier, politician, and diplomat (d. 1792)
1728 – Oliver Goldsmith, Irish-English author, poet, and playwright (d. 1774)
1735 – Granville Sharp, English activist and scholar, co-founded the Sierra Leone Company (d. 1813)
1755 – Franz Anton Ries, German violinist and educator (d. 1846)
1759 – Friedrich Schiller, German poet and playwright (d. 1805)
1764 – Andrés Manuel del Rio, Spanish-Mexican scientist and discoverer of vanadium (d. 1849)
1779 – Anne-Marie Javouhey, French nun, founder of the Sisters of St Joseph of Cluny (d. 1851)
1801 – Vladimir Dal, Russian lexicographer and author (d. 1872)
  1801   – Samuel Gridley Howe, American physician and activist (d. 1876)
1810 – George Jennings, English plumber and engineer, invented the flush toilet (d. 1882)
1834 – José Hernández, Argentinian journalist, poet, and politician (d. 1886)
1844 – Henry Eyster Jacobs, American educator and theologian (d. 1932)
1845 – John Sparrow David Thompson, Canadian lawyer, judge, and politician, 4th Prime Minister of Canada (d. 1894)
1848 – Surendranath Banerjee, Indian academic and politician (d. 1925)
1851 – Richard Armstedt, German philologist, historian, and educator (d. 1931)
1858 – Heinrich XXVII, Prince Reuss Younger Line (d. 1928)
1868 – Gichin Funakoshi, Japanese martial artist and educator, founded Shotokan (d. 1957)
1871 – Winston Churchill, American author and painter (d. 1947)
1873 – Henri Rabaud, French conductor and composer (d. 1949)
1874 – Idabelle Smith Firestone, American composer and songwriter (d. 1954)
1878 – Cy Morgan, American baseball player (d. 1962)
1879 – Vachel Lindsay, American poet and educator (d. 1931)
  1879   – Patrick Pearse, Irish lawyer, poet, teacher, and insurrectionist; executed for his role in the Easter Rising (d. 1916)
1880 – Jacob Epstein, American-English sculptor (d. 1959)
1884 – Zofia Nałkowska, Polish author and playwright (d. 1954)
1886 – Edward Joseph Collins, American pianist, composer, and conductor (d. 1951)
1887 – Elisa Leonida Zamfirescu, Romanian engineer and academic (d. 1973)
  1887   – Arnold Zweig, German author and activist (d. 1968)
1888 – Andrei Tupolev, Russian engineer and designer, founded the Tupolev Company (d. 1972)
1889 – Claude Rains, English-American actor (d. 1967)
1891 – Carl Stalling, American pianist and composer (d. 1972)
1893 – John P. Marquand, American author (d. 1960)
1894 – Boris Furlan, Slovenian lawyer, jurist, and politician (d. 1957)
1895 – József Mátyás Baló, Hungarian physician and academic (d. 1979)
  1895   – Jack Northrop, American businessman, founded the Northrop Corporation (d. 1981)
1896 – Jimmy Dykes, American baseball player and manager (d. 1976)
1899 – Kate Seredy, Hungarian-American author and illustrator (d. 1975)

1901–present
1906 – Josef Kramer, German SS officer (d. 1945)
1907 – Jane Froman, American actress and singer (d. 1980)
  1907   – John Moore, English activist and author (d. 1967)
1908 – Noemí Gerstein, Argentinian sculptor and illustrator (d. 1996)
   1908  – Charles Merritt, Canadian colonel and politician, Victoria Cross recipient (d. 2000)
1909 – Paweł Jasienica, Russian-Polish soldier, journalist, and historian (d. 1970)
  1909   – Johnny Marks, American composer and songwriter (d. 1985)
1910 – Angelo Frattini, Italian sculptor (d. 1975)
1912 – Birdie Tebbetts, American baseball player and manager (d. 1999)
1913 – Karl Shapiro, American poet and academic (d. 2000)
1916 – Louis le Brocquy, Irish painter and illustrator (d. 2012)
  1916   – Billy May, American trumpet player and composer (d. 2004)
1918 – Ernst Otto Fischer, German chemist and academic, Nobel Prize laureate (d. 2007)
1919 – George Fenneman, American radio and television announcer (d. 1997)
  1919   – Michael Strank, American sergeant and flag raiser at the Battle of Iwo Jima (d. 1945)
  1919   – Mikhail Kalashnikov, Russian general and engineer, designed the AK-47 (d. 2013)
  1919   – Moise Tshombe, Congolese accountant and politician, Prime Minister of the Democratic Republic of the Congo (d. 1969)
1920 – Ina Clough, English actress (d. 2003)
  1920   – Rafael del Pino, Spanish businessman, founded the Ferrovial Company (d. 2008)
1923 – Hachikō, Japanese dog famous for his loyalty to his owner (d. 1935)
1924 – Bobby Limb, Australian comedian, actor, and bandleader (d. 1999)
1925 – Richard Burton, Welsh actor and singer (d. 1984)
1927 – Richard Connolly, Australian hymnodist (d. 2022)
  1927   – Vaughn O. Lang, American general (d. 2014)
  1927   – Sohei Miyashita, Japanese politician, Japanese Minister of Defense (d. 2013)
  1927   – Vedat Dalokay, Turkish architect and a former mayor of Ankara (d. 1991)
  1927   – Sabah, Lebanese singer and actress (d. 2014)
1928 – Ennio Morricone, Italian trumpet player, composer, and conductor (d. 2020)
1929 – Marilyn Bergman, American composer and songwriter (d. 2022)
  1929   – W. E. B. Griffin, American soldier and author (d. 2019)
  1929   – Ninón Sevilla, Cuban-Mexican actress and dancer (d. 2015)
1931 – Lilly Pulitzer, American fashion designer (d. 2013)
1932 – Paul Bley, Canadian-American pianist and composer (d. 2016)
  1932   – Necmettin Hacıeminoğlu, Turkish linguist, author, and academic (d. 1996)
  1932   – Roy Scheider, American actor (d. 2008)
  1932   – Arthur K. Snyder, American lawyer and politician (d. 2012)
1933 – Ronald Evans, American captain, engineer, and astronaut (d. 1990)
  1933   – Seymour Nurse, Barbadian cricketer (d. 2019)
1934 – Lucien Bianchi, Italian-Belgian race car driver (d. 1969)
  1934   – Garry Runciman, 3rd Viscount Runciman of Doxford, English sociologist and academic (d. 2020)
  1934   – A. Thurairajah, Sri Lankan engineer and academic (d. 1994)
1935 – Bernard Babior, American physician and biochemist (d. 2004)
  1935   – Igor Dmitriyevich Novikov, Russian astronomer, astrophysicist, and cosmologist
  1935   – Denis Edozie, Nigerian Supreme Court judge (d. 2018)
1939 – Anscar Chupungco, Filipino monk and theologian (d. 2013)
  1939   – Tommy Facenda, American rock & roll singer and guitarist 
  1939   – Allan Moffat, Canadian-Australian race car driver
1940 – Richard Cotton, Australian geneticist and academic (d. 2015)
  1940   – Screaming Lord Sutch, English singer-songwriter and politician (d. 1999)
1942 – Robert F. Engle, American economist and academic, Nobel Prize laureate
  1942   – James Hood, American activist (d. 2013)
  1942   – Hans-Rudolf Merz, Swiss lawyer and politician, 92nd President of the Swiss Confederation
1943 – Saxby Chambliss, American lawyer and politician
  1943   – Ross Warner, Australian rugby league player
1944 – Askar Akayev, Kyrgyzstani economist and politician, 1st President of Kyrgyzstan
  1944   – Mark E. Neely, Jr., American historian, author, and academic
  1944   – Silvestre Reyes, American sergeant and politician
  1944   – Tim Rice, English lyricist and author
1945 – Terence Davies, English actor, director, and screenwriter 
  1945   – Donna Fargo, American singer-songwriter and guitarist
1947 – Glen Buxton, American guitarist and songwriter (d. 1997)
  1947   – Bachir Gemayel, Lebanese commander and politician (d. 1982)
  1947   – Greg Lake, English singer-songwriter, guitarist, and producer (d. 2016)
  1947   – Dave Loggins, American singer-songwriter and guitarist 
1948 – Aaron Brown, American journalist and academic
  1948   – Shigesato Itoi, Japanese video game designer and voice actor, created EarthBound
  1948   – Steven Utley, American author and poet (d. 2013)
1949 – Ann Reinking, American actress, dancer, and choreographer (d. 2020)
  1949   – Don Saleski, Canadian ice hockey player
  1949   – Mustafa Denizli, Turkish footballer and manager
1950 – Debra Hill, American screenwriter and producer (d. 2005)
  1950   – Bram Tchaikovsky, English singer-songwriter and guitarist 
1953 – Les Miles, American football player and coach
1954 – Kevin Spraggett, Canadian chess player
  1954   – Bob Stanley, American baseball player and coach
1955 – Jack Clark, American baseball player, coach, and manager
  1955   – Roland Emmerich, German director, producer, and screenwriter
1956 – Mohsen Badawi, Egyptian businessman and activist
  1956   – Sinbad, American comedian and actor
1957 – Nigel Evans, Welsh politician, Shadow Secretary of State for Wales
1958 – Deborah Cameron, English linguist, anthropologist, and academic
  1958   – Stephen Herek, American director and producer
  1958   – Omar Minaya, American baseball player and manager
  1958   – Massimo Morsello, Italian singer-songwriter and activist (d. 2001)
  1958   – Brooks Williams, American singer-songwriter and guitarist
1959 – Mackenzie Phillips, American actress
  1959   – Michael Schröder, German footballer and manager
1960 – Neil Gaiman, English author, illustrator, and screenwriter
  1960   – Dan Hawkins, American football player, coach, and sportscaster
  1960   – Naomi Kawashima, Japanese actress and singer (d. 2015)
  1960   – Maeve Sherlock, English politician
1961 – Rudolf Grimm, German-Austrian physicist and academic
  1961   – John Walton, English darts player
1962 – Bob Lindner, Australian rugby league player and coach
  1962   – Daniel Waters, American director and screenwriter
1963 – Hugh Bonneville, English actor
  1963   – Mike McCarthy, American football player and coach
  1963   – Mike Powell, American long jumper
  1963   – Tommy Davidson, American actor and comedian
1964 – Kenny Rogers, American baseball player and coach
1965 – Jamie Dixon, American basketball player and coach
  1965   – Eddie Irvine, Northern Irish race car driver
  1965   – Robert Jones, Welsh rugby player and coach
1967 – Jackie Fairweather, Australian runner and coach (d. 2014)
1968 – Tracy Morgan, American comedian and actor
  1968   – Tom Papa, American comedian, actor, television host
1969 – Faustino Asprilla, Colombian footballer and coach
  1969   – Jens Lehmann, German footballer and actor
  1969   – Ellen Pompeo, American actress
1970 – Freddy Loix, Belgian race car driver
  1970   – Sergei Ovchinnikov, Russian footballer and manager 
  1970   – Warren G, American rapper and producer 
1971 – Big Pun, American rapper (d. 2000)
  1971   – Walton Goggins, American actor and producer
  1971   – Magnus Johansson, Swedish footballer
  1971   – Niki Karimi, Iranian actress, director, and screenwriter
1972 – Virág Csurgó, Hungarian tennis player
1973 – Patrik Berger, Czech footballer
  1973   – Marco Antonio Rodríguez, Mexican footballer and referee 
  1974   – Chris Lilley, Australian comedian and producer
1975 – Jim Adkins, American singer-songwriter and guitarist
  1975   – Markko Märtin, Estonian race car driver
1976 – Martin Åslund, Swedish footballer and sportscaster
  1976   – Sergio González Soriano, Spanish footballer and manager
  1976   – Steffen Iversen, Norwegian footballer
  1976   – Shefki Kuqi, Finnish footballer and manager
  1976   – Mike Leclerc, Canadian ice hockey player
1977 – Josh Barnett, American mixed martial artist and wrestler
  1977   – Brittany Murphy, American actress and singer (d. 2009)
  1977   – Erik Nevland, Norwegian footballer
1978 – Ruth Davidson, Scottish politician
  1978   – Jorge DePaula, Dominican baseball player
  1978   – Eve, American rapper and producer
  1978   – Kristian Huselius, Swedish ice hockey player
  1978   – Drew McConnell, Irish bass player 
  1978   – David Paetkau, Canadian actor
1979 – Chris Joannou, Australian bass player 
  1979   – Anthony Réveillère, French footballer
  1979   – Ragnvald Soma, Norwegian footballer
1980 – Danilo Belić, Serbian footballer
  1980   – Agustín De La Canal, Argentinian footballer
  1980   – Jeroen Ketting, Dutch footballer
1981 – Tony Blanco, Dominican baseball player
  1981   – Jason Dunham, American soldier, Medal of Honor recipient (d. 2004)
  1981   – Ezequiel Garré, Argentinian footballer
  1981   – Paul Kipsiele Koech, Kenyan runner
  1981   – Ryback, American wrestler
  1981   – Miroslav Slepička, Czech footballer
  1981   – Brett Tamburrino, Australian baseball player
1982 – Shane Cansdell-Sherriff, Australian footballer
  1982   – Chris Canty, American football player
  1982   – Clayton Fortune, English footballer
  1982   – Heather Matarazzo, American actress
  1982   – Matt Pagnozzi, American baseball player
  1982   – Rafael Rosell, Filipino actor and model
1983 – Brian Dinkelman, American baseball player
  1983   – Dinko Felić, Norwegian footballer
  1983   – Miranda Lambert, American singer-songwriter and guitarist
  1983   – Ryan Mattheus, American baseball player
  1983   – Craig Smith, American basketball player
  1983   – Marius Žaliūkas, Lithuanian footballer (d. 2020)
1984 – Jarno Mattila, Finnish footballer
  1984   – Ludovic Obraniak, Polish footballer
  1984   – Kendrick Perkins, American basketball player
1985 – Ricki-Lee Coulter, New Zealand singer-songwriter and dancer 
  1985   – Daan Huiskamp, Dutch footballer
  1985   – Aleksandar Kolarov, Serbian footballer
  1985   – Cherno Samba, Gambian footballer
  1985   – Krystian Trochowski, German rugby player
1986 – Aaron Crow, American baseball player
  1986   – Will Hendry, English footballer
  1986   – Josh Peck, American actor
  1986   – Goran Jerković, French footballer
  1986   – Stanislav Namașco, Moldovan footballer
  1986   – Eric Thames, American baseball player
  1986   – Samuel Wanjiru, Kenyan runner (d. 2011)
1987 – Sam Malsom, English footballer
  1987   – Kana Oya, Japanese model and actress
  1987   – Charles Hamilton, American rapper
  1987   – Theo Peckham, Canadian ice hockey player
1988 – Massimo Coda, Italian footballer
  1988   – Pauleen Luna, Filipino actress
  1988   – Aiden Tolman, Australian rugby league player
1989 – Daniel Agyei, Ghanaian footballer
  1989   – Luke Daley, English footballer
  1989   – Taron Egerton, Welsh actor
  1989   – Brendon Hartley, New Zealand race car driver
  1989   – Matt Magill, American baseball player
  1989   – Adrian Nikçi, Swiss footballer
  1989   – Sarah Wells, Canadian hurdler
1990 – Andre Blackman, English footballer
  1990   – Marcus Browne, American boxer
  1990   – Aaron Murray, American football player
  1990   – Robert Primus, Trinidadian footballer
  1990   – Kristina Vogel, German track cyclist
  1990   – Leo, South Korean singer
1992 – Marko Blaževski, Macedonian swimmer
  1992   – Teddy Bridgewater, American football player
  1992   – Marek Frimmel, Slovak footballer
  1992   – Dimitri Petratos, Australian footballer
  1992   – Rafał Wolski, Polish footballer
  1992   – Wilfried Zaha, English footballer
1993 – Daieishō Hayato, Japanese sumo wrestler
1994 – Zoey Deutch, American actress
  1994   – Andre De Grasse, Canadian sprinter
  1994   – Claudio Dias, English footballer
1995 – Ralfs Grīnbergs, Latvian ice hockey player 
  1995   – Ryan Peniston, British tennis player 
1996 – Drew Lock, American football player
1997 – Benoit Buratti, French skier
  1997   – Federico Dimarco, Italian footballer
  1997   – Cao Dong, Chinese footballer
  1997   – Marios Georgiou, Cypriot gymnast
  1997   – Maurice Gomis, Italian-Senegalese footballer
  1997   – Daniel James, Welsh footballer
  1997   – Patrik Klačan, Slovak footballer
  1997   – Khalil Madovi, British actor
  1997   – Dhruv Pratap Singh, Indian cricketer
  1997   – Giovanna Scoccimarro, German judoka
  1997   – Yuriy Vakulko, Ukrainian footballer
  1997   – Jasper van Heertum, Dutch footballer
  1997   – Wang Xin, Chinese footballer
1998 – Karen Villanueva, Mexican rhythmic gymnast
1999 – Kiernan Shipka, American actress

Deaths

Pre-1600
 461 – Pope Leo I
 474 – Leo II, Byzantine emperor (b. 467)
 901 – Adelaide of Paris (b. 850)
 948 – Zhao Yanshou, Chinese general and governor
1066 – John Scotus, bishop of Mecklenburg
1068 – Agnes of Burgundy, Duchess of Aquitaine, regent of Aquitaine
1187 – Guðrøðr Óláfsson, King of the Isles
1241 – Pope Celestine IV
1258 – William de Bondington, Bishop of Glasgow
1290 – Al-Mansur Qalawun, Sultan of Egypt (b. c. 1222)
1293 – Isabella de Forz, Countess of Devon (b. 1237)
1299 – John I, Count of Holland (b. 1284)
1444 – Władysław III of Poland (b. 1424)
1549 – Pope Paul III (b. 1468)
1556 – Richard Chancellor, English explorer(b. c. 1521)

1601–1900
1617 – Barnabe Rich, English soldier and author (b. 1540)
1624 – Henry Wriothesley, 3rd Earl of Southampton, English politician, Lord Lieutenant of Hampshire (b. 1573)
1644 – Luis Vélez de Guevara, Spanish author and playwright (b. 1579)
1659 – Afzal Khan, Indian commander
1673 – Michał Korybut Wiśniowiecki, King of Poland (b. 1640)
1727 – Alphonse de Tonty, French-American sailor and explorer (b. 1659)
1728 – Fyodor Apraksin, Russian admiral (b. 1661)
1772 – Pedro Correia Garção, Portuguese poet and author (b. 1724)
1777 – Cornstalk, American tribal chief (b. 1720)
1808 – Guy Carleton, 1st Baron Dorchester, Irish-born English general and politician, 21st Governor General of Canada (b. 1724)
1852 – Gideon Mantell, English scientist (b. 1790)
1865 – Henry Wirz, Swiss-American captain in Confederate army, commandant of Andersonville Prison (b. 1823)
1869 – John E. Wool, American general (b. 1784)
1873 – Maria Jane Williams, Welsh musician and folklorist (b. circa 1794)
1887 – Louis Lingg, German-American carpenter and activist (b. 1864) 
1891 – Arthur Rimbaud, French poet and educator (b. 1854)

1901–present
1909 – George Essex Evans, Australian poet and educator (b. 1863)
1928 – Anita Berber, German dancer (b. 1899)
1936 – Louis Gustave Binger, French general and explorer (b. 1856)
1938 – Mustafa Kemal Atatürk, Turkish field marshal and statesman, 1st President of Turkey (b. 1881)
1941 – Carrie Derick, Canadian botanist and geneticist (b. 1862)
1944 – Claude Rodier physicist (b.1903) 
1946 – Louis Zutter, Swiss gymnast (b. 1856)
1956 – Gordon MacQuarrie, American author and journalist (b. 1900)
1962 – Julius Lenhart, Austrian gymnast and engineer (b. 1875)
1963 – Klára Dán von Neumann, Hungarian-American computer scientist (b. 1911)
1971 – Walter Van Tilburg Clark, American author and academic (b. 1909)
1975 – Ernest M. McSorley, Canadian-American captain (b. 1912)
1982 – Leonid Brezhnev, Ukrainian-Russian general and politician, 4th Head of State of the Soviet Union (b. 1906)
1984 – Xavier Herbert, Australian author (b. 1901)
1986 – Rogelio de la Rosa, Filipino actor and politician (b. 1916)
  1986   – Gordon Richards, English jockey and manager (b. 1904)
1987 – Noor Hossain, Bangladeshi activist (b. 1961)
1990 – Aurelio Monteagudo, Cuban baseball player and manager (b. 1943)
  1990   – Mário Schenberg, Brazilian physicist and academic (b. 1914)
1991 – William Afflis, American football player and wrestler (b. 1929)
1992 – Chuck Connors, American actor (b. 1921)
1994 – Kuvempu, Indian author and poet (b. 1904)
  1994   – Carmen McRae, American singer, pianist, and actress (b. 1920)
1995 – Ken Saro-Wiwa, Nigerian author and activist (b. 1941)
1998 – Mary Millar, English actress (b. 1936)
2000 – Adamantios Androutsopoulos, Greek lawyer and politician, 171st Prime Minister of Greece (b. 1919)
  2000   – Jacques Chaban-Delmas, French general and politician, 153rd Prime Minister of France (b. 1915)
2001 – Ken Kesey, American novelist, essayist, and poet (b. 1935)
2002 – Michel Boisrond, French actor, director, and screenwriter (b. 1921)
2003 – Canaan Banana, Zimbabwean minister and politician, 1st President of Zimbabwe (b. 1936)
  2003   – Irv Kupcinet, American journalist and talk show host (b. 1912)
2004 – Katy de la Cruz, Filipino-American singer and actress (b. 1907)
  2004   – Şeref Görkey, Turkish footballer and manager (b. 1913)
2006 – Diana Coupland, English actress and singer (b. 1932)
  2006   – Fokko du Cloux, Dutch mathematician and computer scientist (b. 1954)
  2006   – Gerald Levert, American singer-songwriter and producer (b. 1966)
  2006   – Jack Palance, American boxer and actor (b. 1919)
  2006   – Nadarajah Raviraj, Sri Lankan lawyer and politician (b. 1962)
  2006   – Jack Williamson, American author, critic, and academic (b. 1908)
2007 – Laraine Day, American actress (b. 1920)
  2007   – Augustus F. Hawkins, American engineer and politician (b. 1907)
  2007   – Norman Mailer, American novelist and essayist (b. 1923)
2008 – Wannes Van de Velde, Belgian singer and poet (b. 1937)
  2008   – Kiyosi Itô, Japanese mathematician and academic (b. 1915)
2009 – Robert Enke, German footballer (b. 1977)
  2009   – John Allen Muhammad, American spree killer (b. 1960)
2010 – Dino De Laurentiis, Italian-American actor, producer, and production manager (b. 1919)
2011 – Peter J. Biondi, American soldier and politician (b. 1942)
  2011   – Ivan Martin Jirous, Czech poet (b. 1944)
2012 – John Louis Coffey, American lawyer and judge (b. 1922)
  2012   – Mitsuko Mori, Japanese actress (b. 1920)
  2012   – Piet van Zeil, Dutch lawyer and politician, Dutch Minister of Economic Affairs (b. 1927)
2013 – Vijaydan Detha, Indian author (b. 1926)
  2013   – John Grant, Australian neurosurgeon (b. 1922)
  2013   – John Matchefts, American ice hockey player and coach (b. 1931)
  2013   – Giorgio Orelli, Swiss poet and translator (b. 1921)
2014 – Josip Boljkovac, Croatian soldier and politician, 1st Croatia Minister of the Interior (b. 1920)
  2014   – Wayne Goss, Australian lawyer and politician, 34th Premier of Queensland (b. 1951)
  2014   – John Hans Krebs, American lawyer and politician (b. 1926) 
  2014   – Dorian "Doc" Paskowitz, American surfer and physician (b. 1921)
  2014   – Al Renfrew, American ice hockey player and coach (b. 1924)
2015 – Gene Amdahl, American computer scientist, physicist, and engineer, founded the Amdahl Corporation (b. 1922)
  2015   – Pat Eddery, Irish jockey and trainer (b. 1952)
  2015   – André Glucksmann, French philosopher and author (b. 1937)
  2015   – Helmut Schmidt, German soldier, economist, and politician, 5th Chancellor of Germany (b. 1918)
  2015   – Allen Toussaint, American singer-songwriter, pianist, and producer (b. 1938)
  2020   – Saeb Erekat, Chief Palestinian negotiator (b. 1955)
2021 – Miroslav Žbirka, Slovak singer, songwriter and guitarist (b. 1952)
2022 – Kevin Conroy, American voice actor (b. 1955)

Holidays and observances
Christian feast day:
Adelin of Séez
Áed mac Bricc
Andrew Avellino
Baudolino
Elaeth
Grellan
Justus
Lübeck martyrs
Pope Leo I
Theoctiste
Tryphena of Rome
November 10 (Eastern Orthodox liturgics)
Cry of Independence Day (Panama)
Day of Remembrance of Atatürk (Turkey)
Day of Russian Militsiya (Russia)
Heroes Day (Indonesia) or Hari Pahlawan
Martinisingen (Germany)
United States Marine Corps birthday (United States)
World Keratoconus Day

References

External links

 
 
 

Days of the year
November